The surname Wolfe may refer to:

A 
 Alan Wolfe, political scientist and sociologist
 Allison Wolfe, singer
 Andy Wolfe, American college basketball player
 Ann Wolfe, boxer
 Anthony Wolfe, footballer
 Art Wolfe, photographer
 Arthur M. Wolfe, American astrophysicist

B 
 Beatie Wolfe, Anglo-American artist and pioneer
 Bernard Wolfe, American writer
 Bernie Wolfe (ice hockey) (born 1951), Canadian National Hockey League player
 Bertram Wolfe, American scholar

C 
 Catharine Lorillard Wolfe, philanthropist
 Charles Wolfe (disambiguation)
 Chelsea Wolfe, singer-songwriter
 Claire Wolfe, author

D
 David W. Wolfe, American politician
 Desmond Wolfe, English professional wrestler
 Dudley Wolfe, American businessman and yachtsman who died climbing K2
 Dusty Wolfe, American professional wrestler

E
 Ed Wolfe (1929–2008), American baseball pitcher
 Edward Wolfe, British soldier
 Edward H. Wolfe, American Union brevet brigadier general during the Civil War era
 Elsie de Wolfe, interior decorator
 Ethyle R. Wolfe (1919–2010), American classicist

F
 Florida J. Wolfe (c. 1867–1913), African-American socialite, philanthropist and rancher

G 
 Gary Wolfe (wrestler), professional wrestler
 Gary K. Wolfe, American author
 Gene Wolfe (1931–2019), American author of science fiction and fantasy
 George Wolfe (cartoonist), American cartoonist
 George Wolfe (CPA), American government administrator in Iraq
 George Wolfe (Irish politician), member of the Irish parliament
 George C. Wolfe, African-American playwright
 Glynn Wolfe, Baptist minister
 Gregory Baker Wolfe, American diplomat

H 
 Heffer Wolfe, fictional character
 Herman L. Wolfe Sr. (1930–1989), American politician
 Hugh Wolfe, American football player
 Humbert Wolfe, British poet

I 
 Ian Wolfe, (1896-1992), actor

J 
 Jack A. Wolfe, American paleontologist
 Jacques Wolfe, musician
 James Wolfe (1727–1759), British general in the Seven Years' War
 Jane Wolfe, actress
 Jasper Wolfe, politician
 Jenna Wolfe, journalist
 John Lewis Wolfe (1798-1881), architect, artist and stockbroker
 John Thomas Wolfe (1955–1995), Canadian veterinarian and politician
 Jonathan Wolfe (Robotech), a fictional character
 Joseph Wolfe, conductor
 Julia Wolfe, American composer

K 
 Kathy Wolfe Moore (born 1957), American politician
 Kelly Wolfe (born 1973), American professional wrestler best known as Wolfie D
 Kenneth H. Wolfe, Irish educator
 Kenneth W. Wolfe (1908-1981), American politician

L 
 Lanny Wolfe, songwriter

M 
 Madison Wolfe American actor
 Malcolm Wolfe (born 1952), Australian cricketer
 Marianne Wolfe, Presbyterian leader
 Michael or Mike Wolfe (disambiguation)
 Miriam Wolfe (1922–2000), American actress, director, producer, and writer

N 
 Nathan Wolfe, biologist
 Nero Wolfe, a fictional detective
 Nick Wolfe, a fictional character from the universe of Highlander: The Raven
 Nyle Wolfe, vocalist / opera singer

P 
 Patsy Wolfe, Australian lawyer and judge
 Paul Wolfe, American NASCAR crew chief and former driver
 Peter Wolfe (musician), English musician
 Peter Wolfe (Sports Rankings), owner of a BCS sports ranking system

R 
 Rachel Wolfe-Goldsmith (born 1991), American artist
 Ralph S. Wolfe (1921–2019), American microbiologist
 Randy Wolfe (1951–1997), known as Randy California, American rock guitarist
 Reginald Wolfe, English printer
 Robert Wolfe (1921–2014), American historian and archivist
 Robert Hewitt Wolfe, American television producer and scriptwriter
 Ronald Wolfe, half of the British scriptwriting duo Chesney and Wolfe
 Rose Wolfe, Canadian former Chancellor of the University of Toronto
 Ryan Wolfe, a fictional character from the show CSI: Miami

T 
 Thomas Wolfe (1900–1938), American novelist
 Tom Wolfe (1930–2018), American journalist and novelist
 Tom Wolfe (woodcarver)

W 
 Walter P. Wolfe (1886-1976), American lawyer and politician
 William Wolfe, Scottish politician
 Winston Wolfe, a fictional character from the movie Pulp Fiction

See also 
 De Wolfe, another surname
 Wolf (name), given name and surname

English-language surnames